A gland is an organ in an animal's body that synthesizes a substance for release.

Gland may also refer to:

Geography
 Gland (Oise), a river in France, tributary of the Oise (river)
 Gland (Rhone), a river in France, tributary of the Rhône
 Gland, Aisne, a commune in the Aisne département, in France
 Gland, Switzerland, a town in Switzerland
 Gland, Yonne, a commune in the Yonne département, in France

Science and technology
 Gland (botany), a secretory structure on a plant that produces a sticky, viscous substance
 Gland (engineering), a type of fluid seal allowing rotary or linear motion
 Cable gland, a device designed to attach and secure the end of a cable to the equipment